Charkhi Dadri Assembly constituency is one of the 90 Vidhan Sabha constituencies in Haryana state in northern India.

Overview
Dadri (constituency number 56) is one of the 2 Assembly constituencies located in Charkhi Dadri District. This constituency covers the Dadri municipal committee and part of Dadri tehsil.

Dadri is part of Bhiwani-Mahendragarh Lok Sabha constituency along with eight other Assembly segments, namely, Loharu, Tosham and Bhiwani in Bhiwani district, Badhra in Charkhi Dadri and Ateli, Mahendragarh, Narnaul and Nangal Chaudhry in Mahendragarh district. This seat is famous because of the association of wrestler Babita Phogat with it. She contested from this seat in the 2019 Assembly Elections on a BJP ticket, but lost to Independent candidate Sombir Sangwan.

Members of Legislative Assembly
1967: Ganpat Rai, Indian National Congress 
1968: Ganpat Rai, Indian National Congress
1972: Ganpat Rai, Indian National Congress (Organization)
1977: Hukam Singh, Janata Party
1982: Hukam Singh, Lok Dal
1987: Hukam Singh, Lok Dal
1991: Dharampal Sangwan, Haryana Vikas Party 
1996: Satpal Sangwan, Haryana Vikas Party
2000: Jagjeet Sangwan, Nationalist Congress Party
2005: Nirpender Sangwan, Indian National Congress
2009: Satpal Sangwan, Indian National Congress
2014: Rajdeep Phogat, Indian National Lok Dal

See also
 Charkhi Dadri

References

Assembly constituencies of Haryana
Bhiwani district